Neff is a surname of German (also Naf, Naef, Kneff), Swiss (also Naff, Naffe, Nafe) Czech or Ashkenazi Jewish origin. It may refer to:

People
Charles D. Neff (1922–1991), American Mormon missionary and humanitarian
Christophe Neff (born 1964), Franco - German geographer 
Donald Neff (contemporary), American journalist
Dorothea Neff (1903–1986), Austrian stage and film actress
Felix Neff (1798–1829), Swiss Protestant divine and philanthropist
Francine Irving Neff (1925-2010), 35th Treasurer of the United States 1974–77
Garrett Neff (born 1984), American fashion model
Henry H. Neff (born 1973), American author and illustrator
Jacob H. Neff (1830–1909), American politician; lieutenant governor of California 1899–1903
Jay H. Neff (1854–1915), American newspaper publisher; mayor of Kansas City 1904–05
Jean-Marie Neff (born 1961), French racewalker
John Neff (American football) (before 1907-1938), American college football coach
John Neff (1931-2019), American investment
Kristin Neff (contemporary), American psychologist
Leonard Neff (1925-2006), American psychiatrist
Lucas Neff (born 1985), American actor
Lyle Neff (born 1969), Canadian poet and journalist
Marcus Neff (1826–1896), American settler in Oregon; respondent in the U.S. Supreme Court case of Pennoyer v. Neff
Ondřej Neff (born 1945), Czech science fiction writer and journalist
Pat Morris Neff (1871–1952), American politician from Texas; governor of Texas 1921–25
Prudence Neff (1887–1949), pianist and music teacher based in Chicago
Tom Neff (born 1953), American film executive, director, and producer
Vladimír Neff (1909–1983), Czech writer and translator
Wallace Neff (1895–1982), American architect
Wolfgang Neff (1875-1936), Czech film director

German-language surnames
Surnames of Czech origin